Huancune (possibly from Aymara wanq'u guinea pig) is a volcano in the Barroso mountain range in the Andes of Peru, about  high. It is situated in the Tacna Region, Tacna Province, Palca District, southeast of Achacollo and north of the Chupiquiña volcano.

References 

Volcanoes of Peru
Landforms of Tacna Region
Mountains of Peru
Mountains of Tacna Region